Parabathymyrus brachyrhynchus is an eel in the family Congridae (conger/garden eels). It was described by Henry Weed Fowler in 1934, originally under the genus Ariosoma. It is a marine, deep water-dwelling eel which is known from the western central Pacific Ocean. It dwells at a maximum depth of 289 metres. Males can reach a maximum total length of 33 centimetres.

The species epithet, "brachyrhynchus", refers to the short snout of the species.

References

Congridae
Fish described in 1934